McAfee is an antivirus and computer security company.

McAfee may refer also to:

Places in the United States
McAfee, Kentucky, unincorporated community in Mercer County, Kentucky
McAfee, New Jersey, an unincorporated area in Vernon Township, New Jersey 
McAfee Coliseum or RingCentral Coliseum, a stadium in Oakland, California
McAfee Peak, in the Independence Mountains of Nevada

Other uses
McAfee (surname), including a list of people with the surname McAfee and MacAfee
McAfee, the tune to the hymn "Near to the Heart of God" written by Cleland Boyd McAfee

See also
McAfee Knob, a mountain feature on the Appalachian Trail in Virginia
Candler-McAfee, Georgia, a census-designated place
McCafé, a fast-food chain owned by McDonald's